Gérard Barreaux (1948 – 16 October 2010) was a French accordionist, composer, and actor. He regularly appeared in performances of Yiddish music with singer-guitarist Moshé Leiser and violinist Ami Flamer.

Discography
 :fr:Denis Levaillant
 Yankele, Yiddish songs

References

French accordionists
1948 births
2010 deaths
20th-century French musicians